LeiLani R. Jones (born July 19, 1982 in Cherry Hill, New Jersey) is a pageant titleholder from Tacoma, Washington who competed in the Miss USA pageant in 2007.

Jones won the Miss Washington USA 2007 title in a state pageant held in Seattle, Washington on November 12, 2006. It was her first attempt at the title. She was crowned by outgoing titleholder Tiffany Doorn of Woodinville, and her sister titleholder was Shalane Larango, Miss Washington Teen USA 2007. Her dress was designed and constructed by Couturière & Milliner, Enna Morgan.

Jones represented Washington in the Miss USA 2007 pageant which was broadcast live from the Kodak Theatre in 2007, but did not place.

Jones graduated from Bethel High School and attended Western Washington while working in a pharmacy. Her major was Sociology and Pharmacology. Her career ambition was to become a Pharmacist specializing in community awareness of Pharmaceutical Drugs and their effects on the community.

Jones interests include fitness, reading, silk flower arranging and teaching Sunday School.

References

1982 births
American beauty pageant winners
Living people
Miss USA 2007 delegates
Miss Washington USA winners
People from Tacoma, Washington